The Legacy of Jihad: Islamic Holy War and the Fate of Non-Muslims is a book by Andrew Bostom, a medical doctor who has written several other works discussing Islamic intolerance. The foreword was written by author and ex-Muslim, Ibn Warraq. The book is framed as a rejection of the notion that Islam is a peaceful religion and sets out to prove that Islam is violent and intolerant.

Contents
The book provides a textual analysis of the concept and practice of jihad ("war against unbelievers in the path of Allah") by examining Islamic theological and legal texts, eyewitness historical accounts of Muslim and non-Muslim chroniclers, and essays by scholars analyzing jihad and the conditions imposed upon the non-Muslim peoples conquered by jihad campaigns.

Reception
The Jerusalem Post calls The Legacy of Jihad "a breakthrough inasmuch as the enormous task of assembling together all the major sources which govern the holy war in Islam had never been attempted before,"

Sources

Bostom, Andrew, ed. (2005). The Legacy of Jihad: Islamic Holy War and the Fate of Non-Muslims. Prometheus Books. .
The Legacy of Jihad
The Legacy of Jihad Reviewed by Lee Harris
All Jihad All the Time

See also
 Criticism of Islam
 Crusade

References

External links 
The Legacy of Jihad at Google Books
Heritage Foundation presentation by Andrew G. Bostom

Books critical of Islam
Counter-jihad
Non-fiction books about jihadism
2005 non-fiction books
Prometheus Books books